Alitta virens (common names include sandworm and king ragworm; older scientific names including Nereis virens are still frequently used) is an annelid worm that burrows in wet sand and mud. It was first described by biologist Michael Sars in 1835. It is classified as a polychaete in the family Nereididae.

Sandworms make up a large part of the live sea-bait industry. To fulfill the needs of this industry, some sandworms are commercially grown. "Sandworming", or the harvesting of sandworms from mudflats, employs over 1,000 people in Maine. , the population of sandworms had diminished greatly over the preceding few years due in large part to overharvesting before the worms are able to reproduce by spawning.  

Sandworms eat seaweed and microorganisms. They have many distinctive traits, including
 often reaching great lengths, sometimes exceeding four feet
 numerous, highly vascularized parapodia along both sides of their bodies
 blue heads with two large pincer teeth which are capable of biting humans

The parapodia function both as external gills (the animal's primary respiratory surfaces), and as means of locomotion (appearing much like short legs).

Usually, sandworms are gonochoric, meaning that they reproduce sexually between the males and females of the species. Sandworms reproduce via a process termed 'swarming'. The female sandworm releases pheromones that attract males to release sperm. Then, the female sandworm ejects eggs to have them fertilized. The production of gametes occurs via the metanephridia gland.

Gallery

References

Phyllodocida
Animals described in 1835